Chaplain (Colonel) Edmund Pepperell Easterbrook, USA (December 22, 1865 – January 18, 1933) was an American Army officer who served as the 2nd Chief of Chaplains of the United States Army from 1928 to 1929.

References

Further reading

United States Army colonels
Burials at Arlington National Cemetery
1865 births
1933 deaths
Chiefs of Chaplains of the United States Army